Vrangiana may refer to the following places in Greece:

Vrangiana, Karditsa or Mikra Vrangiana, a village in Acheloos, Karditsa (regional unit)
Vrangiana, Evrytania or Megala Vrangiana, a village in Agrafa, Evrytania